Primošten is a village and municipality in Šibenik-Knin County, Croatia. It is situated in the south, between the cities of Šibenik and Trogir, on the Adriatic coast.

Demographics
The total population of the municipality is 2,828 (as of 2011 census), distributed in the following settlements:

 Kruševo, population 79
 Ložnice, population 44
 Primošten, population 1,631
 Primošten Burnji, population 739
 Široke, population 154
 Vadalj, population 93
 Vezac, population 88

History
In the past, Primošten was situated on the islet close to the mainland. During the Turkish invasions in 1542 the islet was protected by the walls and towers and a draw bridge connected it to the mainland. When the Turks retreated, the draw bridge was replaced by the causeway and in 1564 the settlement was named Primošten after the Croatian verb primostiti (to bridge).

It is built on a hill and is dominated by the parish church of St. George which was built in 1485 and restored in 1760 close to the local graveyard from which a unique view spreads to the sea and the surroundings.

Heritage
Primošten is famous for its huge and beautiful vineyards. A photo of the vineyards of Primošten hung in the UN center in New York. Apart from its vineyards, Primošten is also known for the traditional donkey race that takes place there every summer. The largest beach in Primošten is called Raduča, and its smaller part, Mala Raduča, is voted one of the 10 most beautiful beaches in Croatia. The area's vineyards are currently under consideration to become a UNESCO World Heritage site.

Culture and events 
Manifestation called "Primoštenske užance" is held every year in the middle of the summer in Primošten. It is a traditional folklore festival where people from Primošten exhibit their cultural specificity and the former way of living in the village.

Gallery

Sport 
JK Primošten (sailing)
MNK Primošten (futsal)
RK Spongiola (diving)
VK Primošten (waterpolo)
BK Primošten (cycling)

See also
 Tentative list of World Heritage Sites in Croatia

References

External links

Picture gallery
Coast view at Dolac u Primoštenu. Part of Primošten municipality.

Municipalities of Croatia
Populated coastal places in Croatia
Populated places in Šibenik-Knin County